Two Sides of Wanda is a studio album by American recording artist Wanda Jackson. It was released in March 1964 via Capitol Records and contained 12 tracks. It was the sixth studio release of Jackson's career; side one contained rockabilly performances,  while side two featured country music selections. The album received a nomination from the Grammy Awards following its release and has since been re-released.

Background and content
In the 1950s, Wanda Jackson became known for her rockabilly selections, some of which became successful like "Fujiyama Mama" and "Let's Have a Party". In 1961, she returned her country music roots. That year she had two top ten country hits with "Right or Wrong" and "In the Middle of a Heartache". Thus, her career shifted back to the genre for the remainder of the decade. Two Sides of Wanda was intended to focus on both her musical identities by putting Rock on one side and Country on the other side of the record. 

The album included a total of 12 selections. All of the songs were cover versions of songs first recorded by other artists. According to Jackson, she chose several songs for the album from artists she admired or befriended. Among these songs was "Honey Don't", a Rockabilly track originally by Carl Perkins. Other Rockabilly cuts included Jerry Lee Lewis' "Whole Lotta Shakin' Goin' On" and Little Richard's "Rip It Up". Among the country selections chosen were Kitty Wells' "Making Believe" and Hank Williams' "Cold, Cold Heart". The album was recorded in July 1963 at the Columbia Studio, located in Nashville, Tennessee. The sessions were produced by Ken Nelson.

Release and reception

Two Sides of Wanda was released in March 1964 on Capitol Records. It marked Jackson's sixth studio album released in her career. The project was originally distributed as a vinyl LP, containing six songs on both sides of the record. In later years, it was re-released with the same track listing to digital and streaming markets, which included Apple Music. Although the album did not receive a formal review by AllMusic, the website did name both "Whole Lotta Shakin' Goin' On" and "Cold, Cold Heart" as their "album picks" for the LP. The album also received a nomination for Best Female Country Vocal Performance at the 7th Annual Grammy Awards. It was Jackson's first nomination from the Grammy's. The project also spawned one single release. In October 1964, "Candy Man" was issued as a single via Capitol Records.

Track listing

Vinyl version

Digital version

Personnel
All credits are adapted from the liner notes of Two Sides of Wanda.

Musical personnel
 Harold Bradley – Guitar
 Floyd Cramer – Piano
 Buddy Harman – Drums
 Wanda Jackson – Lead vocals
 The Jordanaires – Background vocals
 Grady Martin – Guitar
 Charlie McCoy – Harmonica
 Bob Moore – Bass
 Hargus "Pig" Robbins – Piano

Technical personnel
 George Jerman – Photography
 Ken Nelson – Producer

Release history

References

1964 albums
Albums produced by Ken Nelson (United States record producer)
Capitol Records albums
Wanda Jackson albums